Thomas Price Saine (March 8, 1941 – December 5, 2013), usually called Tom Saine, was an American professor of German studies who taught at University of California, Irvine, from 1975 to 2005.

Life and academic career 
Saine was born in 1941 in Brooklyn, New York, the son of Clarence Price Saine and Evelyn Meadows Saine. After attending Christian Brothers High School in Memphis, he studied at Yale University from 1958 to 1962, when he graduated with a B.A. in German. After studying at the University of Tübingen and Rice University, he returned to Yale where he obtained his Ph.D. in 1968 under the supervision of Heinrich E. K. Henel and taught as a German instructor, assistant and associate professor from 1969 to 1975. In 1975, he moved to UC Irvine as associate professor and was promoted to full professor and department chair in 1976. He was one of the original members of the Goethe Society of North America in 1979 and the founding editor of its Goethe Yearbook, which published its first issue in 1982 and the Goethe Society's Vice President 2001–2002. Saine was awarded a Guggenheim Fellowship in 1982. He retired from UC Irvine as emeritus professor in 2005. In 2010, he moved to Texas and lived in Plano, until his death from complications of lung cancer in Dallas on December 5, 2013. Saine was divorced and had two sons.

Research themes and interests 
In his time at Yale, he studied mostly Enlightenment authors, especially radical theologians and freethinkers. His thesis considered the aesthetics of Karl Philipp Moritz (1756–1793). In 1972, he published the first English biography of Georg Forster. At Irvine, his research interests included authors such as Christian Wolff, Johann Gottfried Seume and Adolph von Knigge. He investigated the German Enlightenment and its reaction to the French Revolution in his books The Problem of Being Modern and Black Bread-White Bread.

One of the central topics of Saine's research was Johann Wolfgang von Goethe, and he wrote several essays on Goethe, founded the Goethe Society of North America, edited the Goethe Yearbook that played a central role in American Goethe scholarship, and translated and edited some of Goethe's works. Saine was described as a Goethe fan, and not only owned a large Goethe-related library, but also used Goethe-related vanity plates for his vehicles. His California car registration was GOETHE 1, his California motorcycle registration was GOETHE; when Saine moved to Texas, he was able to obtain another GOETHE plate for his car. His GOETHE 1 California plate later appeared in a novel,  by German author , based on the author's experiences as an international student at Irvine. One of Tom Saine's original GOETHE 1 license plates has been displayed by Fleischhauer at readings.

Publications 
Besides more than forty research articles, Saine wrote the following five books:

Saine also edited some volumes (those with Goethe's autobiographical writings) of Goethe's collected works in English, including his own translations of Campaign in France and Siege of Mainz:

References

External links 
Faculty profile at UC Irvine
Personal website

Germanists
1941 births
2013 deaths
Writers from Brooklyn
University of California, Irvine faculty
Yale University alumni
Deaths from cancer in Texas
Deaths from lung cancer
Yale University faculty